is a Japanese gravure idol. Her real name has not been published. She is represented by Fit One.

Biography
Nanoka's origin of her stage name was from Tanabata's birthday, 7 July from "Nanaka".

She debuted at the Gravure Japan 2011.

In March 2013, Nanoka joined the Girls Unit FaDeLess.

In September 2014, her 4th DVD Nanoka Koi, Nanoka. gained first place in Oricon · Idol Image DVD weekly rankings.

In 2015, Nanoka was elected as Nittelegenic 2015.

Personal life
She uses the phrase "Nun!" is a boom, used for writing Twitter and signatures.
Nanoka is a Hiroshima Toyo Carp fan (Carp Girl).

Works

DVD

Photo albums

Filmography

TV programmes

Radio programmes

Advertisements

Internet

Films

Direct-to-video

Others

References

External links 

 – Fit One 
 – Ameba Blog 

People from Hiroshima Prefecture
Japanese gravure idols
Japanese television personalities
1989 births
Living people